Route 14 is a national route of Uruguay. In 1983, it was assigned the name Brigadier General Venancio Flores. It connects  Mercedes, Uruguay and joins Route 9 on the east coast near La Coronila.

References

Roads in Uruguay